Borah Bergman (December 13, 1926 – October 18, 2012) was an American free jazz pianist.

Training and influences
Bergman was born in Brooklyn to Russian-Jewish immigrant parents. His grandfather Meir Pergamenick was a cantor. Accounts of when he began to learn the piano vary: some assert that he learned clarinet as a child and did not commence his piano studies until adulthood; others, that he had piano lessons from a young age; one of his own accounts is that he took piano lessons as a child, then changed to clarinet, before returning to piano after being discharged from the army. As an adult, he developed his left hand playing to the point where he became essentially ambidextrous as a pianist, and could play equally fast in both hands, and they could act completely independently of each other; Bergman himself preferred the term "ambi-ideation" to "ambidextrous", as it conveyed the added ability to express ideas achieved when both hands were equal. Bergman cited Earl Hines, Bud Powell, and Lennie Tristano as formative influences, although his own style was based on free improvisation rather than song form. Commenting on his other influences, Bergman said that "I was influenced strongly by Ornette Coleman... I was also very influenced by chamber music and Bach and Dixieland or New Orleans, where all of the instruments were playing contrapuntally and polyphonically. So I figured I'd like to do it myself".

Performance and recordings
Until the 1970s he played little in public, concentrating on private practice and his work as a school teacher. He recorded four albums as a soloist, most notably on the European label Soul Note, before embarking on duo and trio albums from the 1990s. A small number of solo and quartet albums were also released from the mid-1990s. The style for which he is best known is described in The Penguin guide to jazz recordings: "His astonishing solo performances recall the 'two pianists' illusion associated with Art Tatum, though in a more fragmentary and disorderly sound-world".

Discography

As leader/co-leader

References

External links
 Borah Bergman: The Long Look 
 

American jazz pianists
American male pianists
1926 births
2012 deaths
Musicians from Brooklyn
Tzadik Records artists
20th-century American pianists
Jazz musicians from New York (state)
20th-century American male musicians
American male jazz musicians
Chiaroscuro Records artists
Black Saint/Soul Note artists
Knitting Factory Records artists
FMR Records artists
Leo Records artists